The men's 800 metres event at the 1959 Summer Universiade was held at the Stadio Comunale di Torino in Turin on 3 and 4 September 1959.

Medalists

Results

Heats
Held on 3 September

Semifinals
Held on 4 September

Final
Held on 4 September

References

Athletics at the 1959 Summer Universiade
1959